Casa Branca (Portuguese for "White House") is a municipality in the state of São Paulo in Brazil. The population is 30,520 (2020 est.) in an area of 864 km². It was founded in 1841. Its nickname is "the Jabuticaba capital"

It is known for the jabuticaba festival held in September, when people can purchase a variety of goods made from the fruit

References

Municipalities in São Paulo (state)
Populated places established in 1841
1841 establishments in Brazil